Aşağı Qaragüvəndli (also, Ashaga Karakyuvendikly and Ashagy Karagyuvyandli) is a village in the Imishli Rayon of Azerbaijan.

References 

Populated places in Imishli District